Giresun Museum is a museum in Giresun, Turkey.
It is a historic basilica named Gogora Church built in the 18th century. It has been constructed with rectangular yellow and brown lime stones adjoined with iron cramps and lead. The main gate faces west. The basilica, abandoned in 1923, was used as a prison between 1948 and 1967 before being redesigned as a museum in 1988. Another building which was used as the clergy house to the north is the administration building.

The majority of items in the museum are from Hellenistic, Roman, Byzantine, Seljuks, and Ottoman eras. Some of the items are terracotta figurines, pottery, amphorae and coins. While the oldest item is dated to 3000 BCE, there is also collection of items from Erikliman excavations.

In the ethnography section, there are 19th century Ottoman items such as clothes, kitchen appliances, hamam (bath) articles, weapons and ornaments. In 1999, an exhibition was held about Topal Osman and his friends, figures of the Turkish War of Independence.

References

Buildings and structures in Giresun Province
Museums in Turkey
1988 establishments in Turkey
Tourist attractions in Giresun Province
Museums established in 1988
Byzantine church buildings in Turkey
Archaeological museums in Turkey
20th-century religious buildings and structures in Turkey